The Timurid Renaissance was a historical period in Asian and Islamic history spanning the late 14th, the 15th, and the early 16th centuries. Following the gradual downturn of the Islamic Golden Age, the Timurid Empire, based in Central Asia ruled by the Timurid dynasty, witnessed the revival of arts and sciences. Its movement spread across the Muslim world. The French word renaissance means "rebirth", and defines a period as one of cultural revival. The use of the term for the description of this period has raised reservations among scholars, some of whom see it as a swan song of Timurid culture.

The Timurid Renaissance was marked slightly earlier than the Renaissance movement in Europe. Some have described it as equal in glory to the Italian Quattrocento. The Timurid Renaissance reached its peak in the 15th century, after the end of the period of Mongol invasions and conquests.

Based on Islamic ideals,  the foundations of the Timurid Renaissance include the rebuilding of Samarkand and the invention of Tamerlane Chess by Timur, the reign of Shah Rukh and his consort Gawhar Shad in Herat (a city which rivaled Florence of the Italian Renaissance as the center of a cultural rebirth), the period of the astronomer and mathematician Ulugh Begh (along with notable polymaths and Islamic scholars), and the construction of additional learning centers by the art patron Sultan Husayn Bayqara. The Timur reign experienced revived interest in classical Persian art. Large-scale building projects were undertaken, creating mausoleums, madrasas, and kitabhane - medieval Islamic book workshops. Mathematical and astronomical studies were reinvigorated, and at the beginning of the 16th century, mastering firearms was achieved.

Major commissions from the Timur's lifetime were the Summer Palace in Shahrisabz, Bibi-Khanym Mosque, and the construction of the Registan. The city of Herat became an important center of intellectual and artistic life in the Muslim world during this time. Samarkand, a center of scholarly study which was previously destroyed during the Mongol conquest of Khwarezmia, became the center of the Renaissance and Islamic civilization in general due to the reconstruction during the period.

The Timurid Renaissance differed from previous Buyid dynasty cultural and artistic developments in that it was not a direct revival of classical models, but rather a broadening of their cultural appeal by including more colloquial styles in Persian language. The Timurid Renaissance was inherited by Mughal India and had significant influence on the other states of the Age of the Islamic Gunpowders (Ottoman Turkey and Safavid Iran).

History 

The Timurid Empire was founded by Amir Tamerlane in 1370 after the conquest of several Ilkhanate successor states. After conquering a city, the Timurids commonly spared the lives of the local artisans and deported them to the Timurid capital of Samarkand.

After the Timurids conquered Persia in the early 15th century, many Islamic artistic traits became interwoven with existing Mongol art. Timur's establishment of the Islamic Sharia law later in life made Samarkand one of the centers of Islamic art. 

In the mid 15th century the empire moved its capital to Herat, which became a focal point for Timurid art. As with Samarkand, artisans and intellectuals of various ethnic backgrounds soon established Herat as a center for arts and culture. Soon, many of the Timurid cultural expressions became mixed with those of other traditions.

Arts 

Timurid art absorbed and improved upon the traditional Persian concept of the "Arts of the Book". The new, Timurid-inflected works of art saw illustrated paper (as opposed to parchment) manuscripts produced by the empire's artists. These illustrations were notable for their rich colors and elaborate designs. Due to the quality of the miniature paintings found in these manuscripts, archaeologist and art historian Suzan Yalman of the Metropolitan Museum of Art noted that "the Herat school [of manuscript painting] is often regarded as the apogee of Persian painting. 

Timurid silver-inlaid steel is often cited as being of particularly high quality. Painting was not limited to manuscripts. Many Timurid artists also created intricate wall paintings. Many of these wall paintings depicted landscapes derived from both Persian and Chinese artistic tradition. While the subject matter of these paintings was borrowed from other cultures, Timurid wall paintings were eventually refined into their own, unique style. 

Mongol artistic traditions were not entirely phased out, as the highly stylized depictions of human figures seen in 15th century Timurid art are derived from this culture.

Sultan Husayn Bayqara's reign saw a further rise in the arts. He was renowned as a benefactor and patron of learning in his kingdom. Sultan Husayn built numerous structures including a famous school. He has been described as "the quintessential Timurid ruler of the later period in Transoxiana." His sophisticated court and generous artistic patronage was a source of admiration, particularly from his cousin, Babur of Mughal India.

Timurid architecture

Timurid architecture drew on aspects of Seljuk architecture. Turquoise and blue tiles forming intricate linear and geometric patterns decorated the facades of buildings. Sometimes building interiors were decorated similarly, with painting and stucco relief further enriching the effect. 

Timurid architecture was the pinnacle of Islamic art in Central Asia. There were spectacular and stately edifices erected by Tamerlane and his successors in Samarkand and Herat. These monumental works helped to disseminate the influence of the Ilkhanid school of art as far as India, where it gave rise to the celebrated Mughal (or Mongol) school of architecture. 

Timurid architecture started with the sanctuary of Ahmed Yasawi in present-day Kazakhstan and culminated in Timur's mausoleum Gur-e Amir in Samarkand. Timur's Gur-I Mir, the 14th-century mausoleum of the conqueror is covered with "turquoise Persian tiles". Nearby, in the center of the ancient town, a "Persian style madrassa" (religious school) and a "Persian style mosque" by Timurid Sultan Ulugh Beg is observed. The mausoleums of Timurid princes, with their turquoise and blue-tiled domes, remain among the most refined and exquisite Persian architecture.

Axial symmetry is a characteristic of all major Timurid structures, notably the Shāh-e Zenda in Samarkand, the Musallah complex in Herat, and the mosque of Gawhar Shad in Mashhad. Double domes of various shapes abound, perfused on the outside with brilliant colors. Timur's dominance of the region strengthened the influence of his capital and Persian architecture upon the Indian Subcontinent.

Metalwork, ceramics, and carving 
The Timurid Empire also produced quality pieces of metalwork. Steel, iron, brass, and bronze were commonly used as mediums. Timurid silver-inlaid steel is often being cited as being of particularly high quality. Following the collapse of the Timurid Empire, several Iranian and Mesopotamian cultures co-opted Timurid metalwork.

Chinese-style ceramics were produced by Timurid artisans. Jade carving also had some presence in Timurid art.

Science 

Jamshid al-Kashi was one of the most influential contributors in the fields of mathematics and astronomy. He got immense support from both Emperor Shah Rukh and Queen Goharshad, who were very interested in the sciences and encouraged theirs court to study the various fields in great depth. Consequently, the period of their power became one of many scholarly achievements.

The rein of Sultan Ulugh Begh saw the scientific peak of the empire. During his rule, al-Kashi produced sine tables to four sexagesimal digits (equivalent to eight decimal places) of accuracy for each degree and includes differences for each minute. He also produced tables dealing with transformations between coordinate systems on the celestial sphere, such as the transformation from the ecliptic coordinate system to the equatorial coordinate system.
The Sullam al-Sama was authored, which provided the resolution of difficulties met by predecessors in the determination of distances and sizes of heavenly bodies such as the Earth, the Moon, the Sun and the Stars. The Treatise on Astronomical Observational Instruments was also written which described a variety of different instruments, including the triquetrum and armillary sphere, the equinoctial armillary and solsticial armillary of Mo'ayyeduddin Urdi, the sine and versine instrument of Urdi, the sextant of al-Khujandi, the Fakhri sextant at the Samarqand observatory, a double quadrant Azimuth-altitude instrument he invented, and a small armillary sphere incorporating an alhidade which he invented.

The invention of the Plate of Conjunctions was seen, an analog computing instrument used to determine the time of day at which planetary conjunctions will occur, and for performing linear interpolation. Invented was also a mechanical planetary computer which he called the Plate of Zones, which could graphically solve a number of planetary problems, including the prediction of the true positions in longitude of the Sun and Moon, and the planets in terms of elliptical orbits; the latitudes of the Sun, Moon, and planets; and the ecliptic of the Sun. The instrument also incorporated an alhidade and ruler.

Ulugh Begh founded an institute in Samarkand which soon became a prominent university. Students from all over Central Asia, and beyond, flocked to this academy in the capital city of his sultanate. Consequently, Ulugh Beg gathered many great mathematicians and scientists, including Ali Qushji.
Ali made significant development of astronomical physics independent from natural philosophy, and for providing empirical evidence for the Earth's rotation in his treatise, Concerning the Supposed Dependence of Astronomy upon Philosophy. In addition to his contributions to Ulugh Beg's famous work Zij-i-Sultani and to the founding of Sahn-ı Seman Medrese, one of the first centers for the study of various traditional Islamic sciences in the Ottoman caliphate, Ali Kuşçu was also the author of several scientific works and textbooks on astronomy. Qushji's most important astronomical work is Concerning the Supposed Dependence of Astronomy upon Philosophy. Under the influence of Islamic theologians who opposed the interference of Aristotelianism in astronomy, Qushji rejected Aristotelian physics and completely separated natural philosophy from Islamic astronomy, allowing astronomy to become a purely empirical and mathematical science. This allowed him to explore alternatives to the Aristotelian notion of a stationary Earth, as he explored the idea of a moving Earth instead (though Emilie Savage-Smith asserts that no Islamic astronomers proposed a heliocentric universe). He also found empirical evidence for the Earth's rotation through his observation on comets and concluded, on the basis of empirical evidence rather than speculative philosophy, that the moving Earth theory is just as likely to be true as the stationary Earth theory.

Legacy 
Following the decline of the Timurid Empire in the late 15th century, the Gunpowder empires, which were the Ottomans, Safavid dynasty, Mughal India and other empires co-opted Timurid artistic traditions into their own.

See also 
 Timurid art
 Turko-Persian tradition
 Timurid relations with Europe
 Timeline of Samarkand

References 

Timurid Empire
Central Asian culture